The Journal of Perinatology is a monthly peer-reviewed medical journal covering perinatology. It was established in 1981 as the Journal of the California Perinatal Association, obtaining its current name in 1984. It is published by Nature Publishing Group on behalf of the California Perinatal Association, of which it is the official journal. The editor-in-chief is Edward E. Lawson (Johns Hopkins Hospital). According to the Journal Citation Reports, the journal has a 2020 impact factor of 2.521.

References

External links

Pediatrics journals
Nature Research academic journals
Obstetrics and gynaecology journals
Publications established in 1981
Monthly journals
English-language journals
Academic journals associated with learned and professional societies of the United States